LCW is a three letter acronym which may stand for:

 London Comedy writers, Comedic writing in London
 Leeds Country Way, footpath in West Yorkshire, England
 Lee Chong Wei, a Malaysian badminton player
 Eames Lounge Chair Wood (LCW), classic chair design
 Leisure Connection Watch, a consumer website monitoring Leisure Connection Ltd
 Link code word in autonegotiation
 .lcw, the file extension for Lucid 3-D spreadsheet
 Lutheran Church Women
 The Lonesome Crowded West, album by Modest Mouse
 Landing Craft, Air propelled